Soul Saliva is the second album by Italian gothic metal band The LoveCrave.

Reception
The songs was recorded in December 2009 at Musicay Studio and Remaster Studio. The first single which was released over his MySpace page was the Cover of Michael Jacksons cult song Thriller.

Release
Soul Saliva was released after three years hard work on 14 May 2010. The US release over Alive Records is set for 24 August 2010. The band promoted and released the album in the United Kingdom on 14 May 2010 as part of his concert in Camden Underworld in London.

Track listing

Personnel
Francesca Chiara - whispering and screams
Tank Palamara - guitar
Simon Dredo - bass guitar
Bob Parolin - drums

Footnotes

2010 albums
The LoveCrave albums